The Initiation of Sarah is a 1978 American made-for-television supernatural horror film directed by Robert Day. It first aired on ABC on February 6, 1978, and starred Kay Lenz as a shy, withdrawn young woman who discovers that she has psychic powers after joining a sorority. The film achieved some controversy upon its initial airing on television as part of the film's plot involved Morgan Fairchild wearing a wet T-shirt after being thrown into a fountain, something that had not been previously shown in a made-for-TV movie.

The film was later re-made in 2006 for ABC Family and Fairchild returned to portray the mother of the titular Sarah and her sister, who was renamed Lindsay. Fairchild initially regretted portraying Jennifer in the 1978 film but later changed her mind after producer Chuck Fries stated that while it was easy to find an ingenue, it was difficult to find someone who could play a convincing "bitch".

Synopsis
The film opens with Sarah (Kay Lenz), a painfully shy young woman, and her beautiful sister Patty (Morgan Brittany) playing on the beach at sunset. Patty wanders off to play in the surf with a young man, only for him to try to force himself on her. After a moment the man recoils and it is implied that Sarah has used telekinesis to save Patty. The film then cuts to the two sisters driving to college. On the way there Patty and Sarah discuss plans for the two of them to join Alpha Nu Sigma (ΑΝΣ) as their mother was a member of the sorority. Sarah points out that she (Sarah) is adopted and that Patty is their mother's only biological child, as she was adopted shortly after she was born.

Once at the campus the two girls attend a rush week party at ΑΝΣ. Patty is instantly welcomed into the sorority's clique while Sarah is directed to the nearby Phi Epsilon Delta (ΦΕΔ) house, as they do not view her as a potential candidate. The sisters both go to the ΦΕΔ house, where they are met with a general lack of enthusiasm from almost all of the girls other than Mouse (Tisa Farrow), an awkward and shy young woman who is instantly drawn to Sarah. After rush week is over Patty is overjoyed to get into ΑΝΣ, but is somewhat hurt when she discovers that not only did Sarah not get in, but that ΑΝΣ president Jennifer (Morgan Fairchild) insists that Patty not speak to Sarah, as she was accepted into ΦΕΔ. This causes friction between the two sisters, as Sarah is frustrated at Patty's reluctant willingness to follow Jennifer's orders.

As the semester progresses Sarah begins to strike up a relationship of sorts with Paul (Tony Bill), a teaching assistant for her psychology classes, and becomes somewhat closer to Mouse. She's unnerved by the ΦΕΔ's den mother Mrs. Hunter (Shelley Winters), who recognizes that Sarah has special powers and insists that she use them to lead ΦΕΔ to glory against the ΑΝΣ. Patty continually tries to find ways to talk to Sarah but is repeatedly unsuccessful and Jennifer's taunting ultimately leads Sarah to use her powers to push Jennifer into a fountain. Feeling vindicated by the encounter, Sarah begins to open up to the idea of her powers but does not fully embrace them until Jennifer orchestrates a cruel prank against Sarah where she is pelted with rotten food, eggs, and mud. While the prank is successful in humiliating Sarah, it finally pushes Patty to leave Jennifer's sorority. Angry, Sarah rebuffs Paul's attempts to persuade her that Mrs. Hunter is evil and that she should leave the sorority, ultimately deciding to hold an initiation ceremony with Mrs. Hunter.

On the night of the ceremony Sarah and the other ΦΕΔs eagerly follow Mrs. Hunter's lead. Sarah notes that Mouse is not at the ceremony but is pacified by Mrs. Hunter's assurances that Mouse will show up at the final portion of the night's events. As the group is led through the ceremony, the ΑΝΣ are also going through their own initiation rites. At Mrs. Hunter's prompting Sarah uses her powers to disrupt the ceremony for an interruption, causing the wind to blow the ΑΝΣ' dresses and cause Jennifer's face to permanently warp into a horrific visage. However, when Sarah discovers that the ΦΕΔ ceremony will end with Mouse getting sacrificed, she uses her powers to stop the ceremony but ends up burning herself and Mrs. Hunter alive. The film ends with Patty deciding to join ΦΕΔ at Mouse's insistence and the two sorrowfully gaze at a picture of Patty and Sarah in happier times.

Cast
 Kay Lenz as Sarah Goodwin
 Shelley Winters as Mrs. Erica Hunter
 Tony Bill as Paul Yates
 Kathryn Grant as Mrs. Goodwin
 Morgan Fairchild as Jennifer Lawrence
 Morgan Brittany as Patty Goodwin
 Robert Hays as Scott Rafferty
 Tisa Farrow as "Mouse"
Elizabeth Stack as O'Neil
 Deborah Ryan as Bobbie Adams
Nora Heflin as Barbara
 Talia Balsam as Allison
 Michael Talbott as Freddie
 Jennifer Gay as Kathy Anderson
 Susan Duvall as Regina Wilson

Production
Morgan Fairchild said when she signed for the film, it was agreed that she would do the shower scene wearing a body stocking, but on the day of the shot, it was suggested that she do it nude. It was going to be filmed through a foggy shower door and nobody would see anything. Fairchild said she partially acquiesced and performed topless. But the scene touched off bad feelings among the cast and crew. A veteran costumer who worked on the show said there were around 25 visitors on the set, which wasn't closed.

Reception
Critical reception for the DVD release of The Initiation of Sarah has been mixed to positive. Most of the reviews shared the opinion that while the film was cheesy, they enjoyed the acting. Multiple reviewers also noted its similarity to the 1976 film Carrie, which also dealt with the subject of a female outcast that discovers telekinetic powers, comparing it unfavorably to the earlier film while still maintaining that The Initiation of Sarah was overall enjoyable.

References

External links
 
 

1978 horror films
ABC network original films
American supernatural horror films
Films about witchcraft
1978 television films
Films about fraternities and sororities
American horror television films
Films directed by Robert Day
1978 films
1970s English-language films
1970s American films